Oskar Goldberg (5 November 1885 - 13 August 1953) was a German-Jewish philosopher, religious thinker and medical doctor.

Biography 
Goldberg was born in Berlin where he attended the orthodox Veitel-Heine-Ephraim school. While he was still at school he published Die Fünf Bücher Mosis: Ein Zahlengebäude in which he attempted a numerically-based interpretation of the Pentateuch, prefiguring a lifelong attempt to ground mystical theological speculations in scientific objectivity. Goldberg then attended the universities of Berlin and Munich, studying in a wide variety of fields including Eastern religious thought, folk psychiatry, psychophysics and therapeutic neuroscience. In 1915 he completed his a doctoral thesis on abnormal biological occurrences in Asian religious sects. After his studies he travelled to Tibet where he lived in a monastery with the Dalai Lama. He published his major work Die Wirchlichkeit der Herbräer in 1925 which further developed his specific form of "rational mysticism". At this time he was a contributor to Thomas Mann's journal Mass und Wert, writing articles on folklore and comparative religion. In 1932, Goldberg left for Italy and later lived in Geneva and France, where he was taken prisoner in 1941. He secured an emergency visa and was able to travel to the United States where he worked as a doctor. In 1950 he returned to Europe and died in Nice three years later at the age of sixty-seven.

Philosophy and Thought 
Goldberg's major work Die Wirklichkeit der Herbräer brought together many of the currents of his speculative thinking. The fundamental idea of his work was the empirical fact of religious experience. He argued secularisation in general is always already an obscuration of the empirical experience of transcendence. For Goldberg each race has a magical connection to a deity and each god is the "biological centre" of a race. A people can only maintain this magical connection by performing the appropriate rituals on territory controlled by its god(s). Taking the Jewish example, Goldberg argues that before Solomon built his temple the god of the ancient Hebrews walked with his people and had his dwelling place among them. But Solomon transformed the Jews from a cultic community into members of a state and thereby severed their organic connection to god by replacing concrete ritual with abstract theological monotheism. Goldberg's ideas confirmed metaphysically his opposition to the formation of all nation-states, including the state of Israel. In most of his subsequent works Goldberg devoted himself to admonishing the Jews for abandoning cultic ritual and pursuing mundane activities. He argues for a return to Biblical practices and a rejection of the "Enlightened" Judaism characteristic of Maimonedes and most subsequent Orthodox Jewish theologians.

Reception and criticism 
Goldberg organised many research groups during his life and moved in the intellectual orbit of, among others, Bertolt Brecht, Walter Benjamin, Alfred Döblin, Karl Korsch and Robert Musil. Thomas Mann was initially an enthusiastic supporter of his and based the first volume of his tetralogy Joseph and his Brothers largely on Goldberg's ideas. Mann eventually turned against Goldberg, describing him as a "typical Jewish fascist" and ridiculing him in his later novel Doktor Faustus through the character of Chaim Breisacher who, like Goldberg, blames Solomon for the destruction of the link between the Jewish people and their God. The famous religious scholar Gershom Scholem also grew to despise Goldberg, describing him as "a small fat man who looked like a stuffed dummy and who exerted an uncanny magnetic power over a group of Jewish intellectuals who gathered around him". However even Scholem recognised the influence of Goldberg in leading one of the only Jewish magical resurgences in modern times. He later described the groups around Aby Warburg, Max Horkheimer and the Frankfurt School and Oskar Goldberg as the three most remarkable "Jewish sects" that German intellectual life ever produced.

References 

German philosophers
1885 births
1953 deaths